Udai Singh I (? –1473)  Udaikaran or Udah, was the Rana (r. 1468–1473) of Mewar Kingdom. He was a son of Rana Kumbha.

Biography 
Udai Singh killed his father, Rana Kumbha, in 1468 and thereafter became known as Hatyara (Murderer). Udai himself died in 1473, with the cause of death sometimes being stated as a result of being struck by lightning but more likely to have also been murder by his own brother Rana Raimal to avenge the death of their father, Rana Kumbha.

The death by lightning account is mentioned in the Mewar chronicle Vir Vinod, by Kavi Shyamaldas, which James Tod mistook to be about the sultan of Delhi rather than Ghiyath Shah, the Sultan of Malwa. It was Shah who agreed to render assistance to Udai Singh, and in return Udai Singh agreed to give his daughter in marriage to him. The proposed matrimonial alliance aimed at establishing friendly relations between the two States. But destiny had it otherwise. Rana Udai Singh was struck with lightning, when he was returning to his camp, after completing the negotiations, and thus the entire plan fell through and no marriage took place. Surajmal and Sahasmal, however, remained in the Malwa court and continued to press the Sultan to help them in recovering their patrimony. Sultan Ghiyath Shah finally agreed to assist them and with his forces marched on Chittor.

References 

Year of birth unknown
Mewar dynasty
1473 deaths